Zollicoffer may refer to:

People with the surname
Felix Zollicoffer (1812-1862), American politician and Confederate general
Felix Zollicoffer Wilson (1866-1950), American politician

Places
General Felix K. Zollicoffer Monument, monument in Kentucky, U.S.
Zollicoffer's Law Office, historic building in North Carolina, U.S.